Bard on the Beach is Western Canada's largest professional Shakespeare festival. The theatre Festival runs annually from early June through September in Vancouver, British Columbia, Canada. The Festival is produced by Bard on the Beach Theatre Society whose mandate is to provide Vancouver residents and tourists with affordable, accessible Shakespearean productions of the finest quality. In addition to the annual summer festival, the Society runs a number of year-round theatre education and training initiatives for both the artistic community and the general community at large. Bard on the Beach celebrated its 30th anniversary season in 2019.

History

Bard on the Beach began as an Equity Co-op in the summer of 1990, funded primarily by an Explorations Grant awarded to Artistic Director Christopher Gaze by the Canada Council for the Arts.  Following his graduation from the Bristol Old Vic Theatre School, Gaze had moved to Canada on the advice of his friend, mentor and theatre legend Douglas Campbell.  After performing with a variety of theatre companies and festivals across Canada, including three seasons with the Shaw Festival, Gaze moved to Vancouver in 1983 where he performed as Richard III in the 1984 season of the now defunct Vancouver Shakespeare Festival.

While in Vancouver, Gaze became acquainted with a group of actors and fellow Shakespeare lovers when he was asked to direct a production of Under Milk Wood for the 1989 Vancouver Fringe Festival.  The following summer, this same group staged A Midsummer Night's Dream in a rented theatre tent in Vanier Park as the inaugural Bard on the Beach production. The company's initial four-week run drew a total of 6,000 people and signaled the need for a more formal company structure.  Bard on the Beach officially registered as a not-for-profit under the Society Act of BC in December, 1990.

Site

Bard is located in Vanier Park at the south end of the Burrard Street Bridge. It consists of two performance stages: the BMO Mainstage and the Howard Family Stage. There is also a group of tents known as the Bard Village which contains the box office, Bard Boutique gift shop, and concession stands.  The festival grounds also contain dressing rooms, administrative offices for seasonal staff and an event Marquee along with two large picnic lawns and portable washrooms for patrons.

BMO Mainstage

Bard purchased its first 500-seat saddlespan tent in 1992.  By the end of the 2010 season, the Mainstage theatre tent was in need of replacement and, following the "Staging our Future" capital campaign, the Festival built a custom-designed Mainstage theatre tent.  The new tent expanded the seating capacity to 742 seats and included a redesigned stage.  The theatre tent also came with more comfortable seating for patrons including cup holders for drinks purchased from the concession stands. The new tent maintains an open-backed design and Bard's signature backdrop: False Creek; the Coast Mountains; and city skyline.  The physical playing space within the theatre was named after the Bank of Montreal in recognition of their lead contribution to the Festival's capital campaign.

Bard on the Beach typically stages two productions in repertory on the BMO Mainstage in each season, alongside a selection of choral, symphony and opera presentations.  The set presents a unique challenge and opportunity for set designers from year to year as it must incorporate elements which can be shared by both productions during season.

Howard Family Stage and the Douglas Campbell Theatre tent

The Douglas Campbell Theatre tent was added in 1999 as part of Bard's 10th anniversary season as an intimate space for the staging of Shakespeare's lesser-known works or for more modern, innovative stagings of the established canon.  Beginning in 2005 with a production of Rosencrantz and Guildenstern Are Dead by Tom Stoppard, the theatre tent has also served as a space for productions of plays which, while not by Shakespeare, serve to examine the context of his work.

The theatre is named for the Canadian stage actor Douglas Campbell.  Campbell was a good friend and mentor to Christopher Gaze and had either performed in, or directed, plays in Bard's earlier seasons. Campbell and his son Torquil Campbell also performed together in productions of Henry IV, Part I and Macbeth at Bard on the Beach.

This smaller theatre tent seats 240 people and its adaptable layout and seating configuration are similar to that of a black box theatre.  The tent structure was replaced at the beginning of the 2013 season as part of the "Staging our Future" capital campaign.

In 2014 the playing space was named the "Howard Family Stage" in honour of Vancouver philanthropists Darlene and Paul Howard.

Bard Education
In addition to operating the Festival, the Bard on the Beach Theatre Society operates a host of youth-oriented outreach programs under the umbrella of Bard Education.  Collectively, the programs endeavour to inspire the community through dynamic, engaging experiences with the language, characters and plays of William Shakespeare.

Bard in the Classroom
Bard in the Classroom workshops are delivered by Teaching Artists - actors, directors and other theatre practitioners trained by Bard to facilitate workshops for young people.  The in-class workshops can be adapted for all age groups have been delivered for students between the ages of 4 and 18.  Teachers can request 90-minute sessions focusing on introductions to Shakespeare's work as a whole or focus on a specific play, scene or set of characters.  Participants mix voice and language work with active theatre exercises to explore Shakespeare's work in a performance context.

Professional Development
Unlike Bard Education's other programs, Bard's Professional Development workshops are open to educators of all grades, subjects, and levels of experience from across British Columbia. Like Bard in the Classroom, Bard's Professional Development workshops focus on introducing participants to Shakespeare through active theatre exercises however, the program is more focused on teacher training than those programs oriented for students and youth.

Young Shakespeareans Workshops
The Young Shakespeareans Workshop program has been offered each season on the grounds of Bard on the Beach Shakespeare Festival for youth aged 8 through 18 since 1993.  The program runs between 15 and 17 two-week sessions for "Juniors" aged 8 to 13 and "Seniors" aged 13 to 18.  There is also a one-week intensive theatre training program offered for youth aged 15 through 18.

As of the 2014 season, Young Shakespeareans Workshops Teaching Artists are also assisted by participants in the Riotous Youth apprenticeship program.

Riotous Youth
Conceived as a kind of "graduate" counterpart to the Young Shakespeareans Workshops, the Riotous Youth theatre apprenticeship program was launched in 2014 to provide an opportunity to bridge the learning of young theatre enthusiasts whom had aged out of the workshop program.  Participants aged 19 through 24 take an active role in assisting Young Shakespeareans Workshops Teaching Artists, deliver pre-show introductory talks to the audience and work with a veteran Bard company actor to prepare a final presentation at the end of the season.  The Riotous Youth also participate in a variety of other programs throughout the Bard season including the Bard-B-Q & Fireworks and off-site presentations.

Other events
In addition to the four plays, there are a number of events throughout the summer:
 Bard-B-Q and Fireworks
 Wine Wednesdays
 Family Days
 Opera & Arias
 Exploring Shakespeare
 Talkback Tuesdays
 Chor Leoni Men's Choir (see their web page)

Productions

1990 – 1999 

1990
A Midsummer Night's Dream
1991
A Midsummer Night's Dream
As You Like It
1992
Twelfth Night
The Tempest
1993
The Taming of the Shrew
Romeo and Juliet
1994
The Merry Wives of Windsor
King Lear
1995
The Comedy of Errors
Hamlet
1996
Much Ado About Nothing
The Merchant of Venice
Shylock by Mark Leiren-Young
1997
Love's Labour's Lost
The Winter's Tale
1998
As You Like It
Richard III
1999
A Midsummer Night's Dream
Macbeth
Measure for Measure

Bard Peak Performances (1995–1998) 
From 1995 to 1998, bard added a short series of Peak Performances to the Festival's season.  A selection of weekend matinee performances were presented at the peak of Grouse Mountain in North Vancouver.

2000 – 2009 

2000
The Tempest
Henry IV, Part 1
All's Well That Ends Well
2001
The Taming of the Shrew
Antony and Cleopatra
The Two Gentlemen of Verona
2002
Twelfth Night
Henry V
Cymbeline
2003
The Comedy of Errors
The Merchant of Venice
Pericles, Prince of Tyre
Shylock by Mark Leiren-Young
A Midsummer Night's Dream (Bard in the Vineyard)
 Christopher Gaze directed a production of A Midsummer Night's Dream which ran from July 31 to August 31, 2003 at the Mission Hill Family Estate.  While the production was successful in reaching new audiences in the Okanagan Valley, the Okanagan Mountain Park Fire had an adverse effect on attendance.  In some cases, performances of the production were interrupted as regional evacuation notices were read from the stage.
2004
Much Ado About Nothing
The Merry Wives of Windsor
Macbeth
2005
As You Like It
Love's Labour's Lost
Hamlet
Rosencrantz & Guildenstern Are Dead by Tom Stoppard
2006
A Midsummer Night's Dream
Measure for Measure
The Winter's Tale
Troilus and Cressida
2007
The Taming of the Shrew
Romeo and Juliet
Timon of Athens
Julius Caesar
2008
King Lear
Twelfth Night
The Tempest
Titus Andronicus
2009
All's Well That Ends Well
The Comedy of Errors
Othello
Richard II

2010 – 2019 
2010
Antony and Cleopatra
Falstaff (a combination of Henry IV, Part 1 and Henry IV, Part 2, adapted by Errol Durbach)
Henry V
Much Ado About Nothing

2011
As You Like It
The Merchant of Venice
Henry VI: The Wars of the Roses (a combination of Henry VI Parts 1, 2, and 3, adapted by Christopher Weddell)
Richard III

2012
Macbeth
The Merry Wives of Windsor
The Taming of the Shrew
King John

2013
Hamlet
Twelfth Night
Measure for Measure
Elizabeth Rex by Timothy Findley

2014
A Midsummer Night's Dream
The Tempest
Equivocation by Bill Cain
Cymbeline

2015

The Comedy of Errors
King Lear
Love's Labour's Lost
World Premiere of Shakespeare's Rebel by Chris Humphreys

2016

The Merry Wives of Windsor
Romeo and Juliet
Othello
Pericles

2017
Much Ado About Nothing
The Winter's Tale
The Merchant of Venice
Shylock by Mark Leiren-Young
The Two Gentlemen of Verona

2018

As You Like It
Macbeth 
Timon of Athens
Lysistrata

2019 (30th Season)

The Taming of the Shrew
Shakespeare In Love
All's Well That Ends Well
Coriolanus

2020 – present 

2020

Cancelled due to the global COVID-19 pandemic in British Columbia. The planned 2020 productions were rescheduled for the 2021 season.
A Midsummer Night's Dream (cancelled)
Henry V (play) (cancelled)
Love's Labour's Lost (cancelled)
Paradise Lost by Erin Shields (cancelled)

2021

No in-person presentations due to COVID-19. Digital programming and events offered online.
Done/Undone by Kate Besworth (commissioned for a digital season)

2022

A Midsummer Night's Dream
Harlem Duet by Djanet Sears
Romeo and Juliet

References

External links

Theatre companies in British Columbia
Festivals in Vancouver
Shakespeare festivals in Canada
Theatre in Vancouver
Festivals established in 1990
1990 establishments in British Columbia
Theatre festivals in British Columbia